"Pet Sematary" is a single by American punk rock band Ramones, from their 1989 album Brain Drain. The song, originally written for the Stephen King 1989 film adaptation of the same name, became one of the Ramones' biggest radio hits and was a staple of their concerts during the 1990s. The song plays over the film’s credits.

Background
King is a huge Ramones fan and invited the band to his Bangor, Maine home as they played in New England. During the visit, he handed Dee Dee Ramone a copy of his Pet Sematary novel, and the bassist retreated to the basement. One hour later, Dee Dee returned with the lyrics to "Pet Sematary". Shortly afterwards, drummer Marky Ramone said that Dee Dee's attitude that day showed that he could achieve his plans to leave the band and attempt a career at hip hop music. He likened Dee Dee to King, saying that both wrote things people could relate to because they "penetrated to the curiosity, fears, and insecurities carried around with them and couldn't put into words."

Composition
Producer Daniel Rey became a co-writer by assisting with the structure of the song, while producer Jean Beauvoir of the Plasmatics helped give the song a more commercial style fit for radio play and film inclusion. As "Pet Sematary" sounded closer to the rock ballads of the period, it was a struggle for Johnny Ramone to play the arpeggios and chords, despite Dee Dee's guidance.

Promotion
The music video for "Pet Sematary" was filmed at the Sleepy Hollow Cemetery in the eponymous New York village. Shot on a cold night in January 1989, the video features black and white shots of the Ramones walking through the graveyard, as well as color footage of the band and various others miming to the song alongside an open grave. The video ends with the band playing on a hydraulic platform placed inside the open grave, which is gradually lowered until a group of undertakers covers the grave with a headstone that reads "The Ramones". It was the last video featuring Dee Dee Ramone, who would depart the band and be replaced with C. J. Ramone. The video features cameos by Debbie Harry and Chris Stein of Blondie, as well as members of the Dead Boys. An alternate edit of the video features the aforementioned scenes interspersed with scenes from the film, with the opening footage of the band walking through the graveyard now appearing in color.

Reception
"Pet Sematary" became the band's highest-charting hit in the US, peaking at number 4 on the Billboard Modern Rock Tracks chart and number 6 on the Radio & Records New Rock chart. However, reception for the song was not entirely positive, as it was also nominated for the now-defunct Razzie Award for Worst Original Song in 1989.

Cover versions
The Huntingtons recorded a cover of the song on their album File Under Ramones (1999).
The Groovie Ghoulies recorded covers of the song twice, first on Gabba Gabba Hey: A Tribute to the Ramones (1991), and later on their collection Monster Club (2003).
An instrumental cover of the song is featured on the eponymous debut album by Ramonetures (2000).
From May to July 2001 Rammstein played a cover of the song as a Tribute to Joey Ramone. Most of the vocals are sung by the band's keyboardist, Christian Lorenz. The third and background verses are sung by Zak Tell, singer of Clawfinger. Rarely Till Lindemann, Rammstein's lead singer, would sing in place of Zak Tell.
Backyard Babies recorded a cover of the song, which appears on the 2002 tribute album The Song Ramones the Same.
Michelle Darkness covered the song on the 2007 album Brand New Drug.
The Creepshow covered the song on their 2009 album Run for Your Life.
A cover version by Plain White T's was included in the Frankenweenie Unleashed! album (2012).
Hawthorne Heights recorded a cover, appearing on Ohio is for Covers (2015).
Muncie Girls recorded a cover of the song on their 2015 split with Sandlotkids.
Energy released a music video for their cover version in October 2015 .
A cover version was released for the 2019 film adaptation, performed by American punk rock band Starcrawler.
Bands who have covered the song live include Blondie,  and Misfits.
Robin Wilson of the Gin Blossoms recorded a cover of the song in October 2020 together with Paul Masson of Great American Canyon Band and drummer Andy Herrin. Wilson's son Grey performed the guitar solos. The group billed themselves as "Robin Wilson and the Last Rites".

Chart performance

References 

Songs about animals
Songs about death
Ramones songs
Rammstein songs
1989 singles
1989 songs
2001 songs
Songs written by Dee Dee Ramone
Song recordings produced by Bill Laswell
Music based on novels
Horror punk songs
Adaptations of works by Stephen King
Pet Sematary
Sire Records singles
Chrysalis Records singles
Gothic rock songs